Irajá Station is a subway station on the Rio de Janeiro Metro that services the neighbourhood of Irajá in the North Zone of Rio de Janeiro.

References

Metrô Rio stations